YMCA FC is a football club of East Timor based in Dili. The team plays in the Liga Futebol Amadora.

Competition records

Liga Futebol Amadora 
2016: 2nd places in Groub A Segunda Divisao

Taça 12 de Novembro
2016: 2nd Round

References

Football clubs in East Timor
Football
Sport in Dili
Association football clubs established in 2006
Sports clubs founded by the YMCA